is a prolific Japanese composer and arranger for anime and video game series. His anime composition credits include Naruto Shippuden, Fairy Tail, Log Horizon, Shiki, Hell Girl, and Record of Ragnarok.

Biography
Takanashi was born in Tokyo, in 1963. At the age of 18, he began playing keyboard, later working as the keyboardist for the band Hellen. In 1993, he formed the group Planet Earth with a Hellen's guitarist and others, releasing the album Big Bang in the same year.

In the late 1990s, he joined Musashi Project, a rock band which features traditional Japanese musical instruments. In 2002, alongside Musashi and Toshio Masuda, he made his debut as a composer in the anime series Naruto, writing the track "Sadness and Sorrow".

He is currently the leader of the group Yaiba, which co-composes some of Takanashi's soundtrack works.

Takanashi has received the JASRAC International Award for the soundtrack of Naruto Shippuden five times—in 2013, 2014, 2017, 2020 and 2021.

Works

Anime

Anime films

Video games

Television dramas

Live-action films

Drama CDs

Discography

With Hellen

With Planet Earth

With Musashi

References

External links
 Yasuharu Takanashi at VGMdb
 
 

1964 births
Anime composers
Japanese composers
Japanese film score composers
Japanese male composers
Japanese male film score composers
Japanese music arrangers
Living people
Musicians from Tokyo
Video game composers